The women's sprint in the FIS Nordic World Ski Championships 2013 was held on 21 February 2013. The qualifying was held in the morning to determine the final participants.

Marit Bjørgen of Norway successfully defended her title from the previous championships and won the gold medal, while Ida Ingemarsdotter of Sweden won the silver medal, and Maiken Caspersen Falla of Norway won the bronze.

Qualification

Quarterfinals

Quarterfinal 1

Quarterfinal 2

Quarterfinal 3

Quarterfinal 4

Quarterfinal 5

Semifinals

Semifinal 1

Semifinal 2

Finals
The races were held from 12:45 to 14:13.

References

Women's sprint
2013 in Italian women's sport